Window Rock is a census-designated place that serves as the seat of government and capital of the Navajo Nation, the largest territory in North America of a sovereign Native American nation. The capital lies within the boundaries of the St. Michaels Chapter, adjacent to the Arizona and New Mexico state line. Window Rock is the site of the Navajo Nation governmental campus, which contains the Navajo Nation Council, Navajo Nation Supreme Court, the offices of the Navajo Nation President and Vice President, and many Navajo government buildings.

Window Rock's population was 2,712 at the 2010 census. It is estimated to reach around 20,000 during weekdays when tribal offices are open.

Window Rock's main natural attraction is the window formation of sandstone which the community is named after. The Navajo Nation Museum, the Navajo Nation Zoological and Botanical Park, and the Navajo Nation Code Talkers World War II memorial are tribal attractions located in Window Rock.

Origin of name 

Until 1936, the area was sparsely populated and known by the Navajo only by its ceremonial name  ("Center of the World"). John Collier, a reforming Commissioner of Indian Affairs, chose this site to establish the seat of the Navajo Central Agency, the Bureau of Indian Affairs official connection to the nation. His proposal to make the ceremonial name the official name met with resistance, and Navajos soon ridiculed it as "" (~ "into your middle (parts)").

Due to this, the BIA chose the name of the major local landmark, the rock-with-hole-through-it for this Indian agency site. It was rendered in English as Window Rock.

, as the Navajo call it (meaning the Perforated Rock), is north of the Navajo governmental administration buildings. It is important in the traditional Navajo Water Way Ceremony. It was one of the four places where Navajo medicine men go with their traditional woven water jugs to get water for the ceremony that is held to pray for an abundance of rainfall.

Government

Window Rock is the capital of the Navajo Nation government. Its complex houses the Navajo Nation President and Vice President, Navajo Nation Supreme Court, the 24-member Navajo Nation Council, and  Navajo government administration buildings. As a district within the St. Michaels Chapter, Window Rock is served by a Navajo Council Delegate and Chapter President and Vice President.

Geography 

The Arizona/New Mexico state line marks the town's eastern edge, and some of the town's buildings are located a few feet (meters) from the state line. Immediately across the state line from Window Rock is the village of Tse Bonito, New Mexico.

The area is atop and encompassed within the Defiance Plateau.

Climate 

The city is cooler than most of Arizona due to its high elevation.

<div style="width:80%;">

Note

Features
The greater Window Rock area comprises the Fort Defiance and St. Michaels chapters, and the hamlets of Hunter's Point and the Summit in Arizona, and Tse Bonito on the New Mexico side of the border.

Demographics 

As of the census of 2000, there were 3,059 people, 876 households, and 713 families residing in the CDP. The racial makeup of the CDP was 95.5% Native American, 3.2% White, 0.4% Asian, 0.2% African American, <0.1% Pacific Islander, 0.1% from other races, and 0.7% from two or more races. Hispanic or Latino of any race were 1.4% of the population.

There were 876 households, out of which 51.0% had children under the age of 18 living with them, 43.7% were married couples living together, 29.7% had a female householder with no husband present, and 18.6% were non-families. 15.6% of all households were made up of individuals, and 2.4% had someone living alone who was 65 years of age or older. The average household size was 3.42 and the average family size was 3.81.

In the CDP, the age distribution of the population shows 36.3% under the age of 18, 10.9% from 18 to 24, 28.7% from 25 to 44, 19.6% from 45 to 64, and 4.5% who were 65 years of age or older. The median age was 27 years. For every 100 females, there were 92.6 males. For every 100 females age 18 and over, there were 88.4 males.

The median income for a household in the CDP was $36,885, and the median income for a family was $36,500. Males had a median income of $27,266 versus $26,902 for females. The per capita income for the CDP was $11,122. About 24.6% of families and 24.6% of the population were below the poverty line, including 28.6% of those under age 18 and 6.8% of those age 65 or over.

Education
Window Rock is a part of the Window Rock Unified School District, which serves the greater Fort Defiance and St. Michaels chapters population center.

Window Rock is served by:
 Window Rock Elementary School
 Tséhootsooí Middle School
 Window Rock High School located in the Fort Defiance Chapter.

The community is also served by the private Saint Michael Indian School, a K-12 private, Catholic school established by Katharine Drexel in 1902. Saint Michael Indian School is a member of the National Catholic Education Association and the Diocese of Gallup Catholic School System.

The surrounding community is also served by Hilltop Christian School, operated by Across Nations offering pre-K through 6th grade learning curriculum.

In addition, the Saint Michaels Association for Special Education, Inc. (SMASE) school serves the greater Navajo Nation in Arizona and New Mexico.  A non-profit school, founded by Sister Marijane Ryan in 1970 serves as an educational and residential center for individuals with disabilities of all ages.

Travel and tourism
Tourism is an integral part of the local economy. Window Rock attracts a large number of tourists and visitors due to its close proximity to many national parks and sites and Navajo government. The area is a popular base of commerce for the regional people as well.

Window Rock is near to:
 Hubbell Trading Post National Historic Site
 Diné College
 Petrified Forest National Park
 Canyon de Chelly National Monument
 Chaco Culture National Historical Park
 Gallup, New Mexico

Navajo Nation Museum
In the year of 1961 the Navajo Tribe established the first Navajo Tribal Museum in a small building on the Window Rock Tribal Fairgrounds. It was moved in 1982 to the back room of the Navajo Arts and Crafts Store. In 1997, a $7 million permanent home was  built to store the Navajo artifacts in a museum specially built in a modern Navajo hogan style near the Navajo Nation Zoo. The Navajo Nation Museum and its colocated Library offer many relics and artifacts of the Navajo people and Navajo Nation, many resources on the Navajo people, language and ceremonies are also offered in the Navajo Nation Library which is adjacent to the museum. The museum is open Monday through Friday and is free to the public.

Navajo Nation Zoological and Botanical Park 
The Navajo Tribal Zoo opened in Window Rock in 1963 featuring reservation animals such as bear, coyotes, snake, elk, and the golden eagle. The Navajo Nation Zoological and Botanical Park offers a wide variety of plants, animals, fishes, birds and insects native to the Four Corners area of the Navajo Nation such as elk, mule deer, Mexican gray wolf, black bear, cougar, golden eagle, bighorn sheep, lynx, Rio Grande wild turkey, raccoon, Canada goose, and fox. The Navajo Nation Zoo is open Monday through Saturday and is free to the public.

Ch'ihootso Indian Market Place
The Ch'ihootso Market Place offers many vendors with Navajo arts and crafts along with Hopi, Zuni and local artists. The market place is open from 5:00 am to 6:00 pm Monday through Sunday.

Infrastructure

Transportation
Window Rock is served by Arizona State Route 264, and Indian Route 12 .

Window Rock is served by a local regional airport : Window Rock Airport. Window Rock Airport is a public use airport located one nautical mile south of the central business district of Window Rock, in Apache County. It is owned by the Navajo Nation.

Local transportation is provided by the Navajo Transit System which operates from Window Rock. It provides several routes that serve the community, the Navajo Nation, the Hopi Nation, and San Juan Southern Paiute Tribe.

Business

Window Rock is served by two regional shopping centers: Diné Bashas' and Lowe's Market. The Navajo Nation Shopping Center Enterprise also serves the area.

Culture
Numerous events are hosted throughout the year in the greater Window Rock area, which includes Fort Defiance and St. Michaels, such as:
 Fourth of July Celebration & PRCA ProRodeo
 Navajo Nation Fair
 Navajo Nation Treaty Day Celebration
 Navajo Nation Prayer Day
 Megabucks Bull Riding

Health care
Window Rock is served by the Tséhootsooí Medical Center. Located in Fort Defiance, Arizona it also serves the Window Rock and the surrounding area.

See also

 Gallup, New Mexico
 Ganado, Arizona
 Katharine Drexel
 Miss Navajo
 Navajo Nation Scenic Byways
 Navajo people

References

Further reading

External links 

 Window Rock profile, with more links to the most interesting sites about Tségháhoodzání and the Dinétah

Seats of government of American Indian reservations
Census-designated places in Apache County, Arizona
Populated places on the Navajo Nation
Census-designated places in Arizona
Cities in Arizona